Soyuz TMA-17 was a human spaceflight mission to the International Space Station (ISS). TMA-17 crew members participated in ISS Expedition 22 and Expedition 23. The mission ended when the Soyuz TMA-17 capsule landed on 2 June 2010.

Crew

Crew notes 
Noguchi is the first Japan Aerospace Exploration Agency (JAXA) astronaut and the second Japanese astronaut to fly on a Soyuz, after Toyohiro Akiyama.

Backup crew

Launch and docking 
Soyuz TMA-17 was launched on 20 December 2009 and transported three members of the ISS Expedition 22 crew to the station. Soyuz TMA-17 was the 104th flight of a Soyuz spacecraft. The Soyuz remained docked to the space station for the remainder of the Expedition 22 increment serving as an emergency escape vehicle.

This mission marked the first Soyuz launch in the month of December for more than 19 years. The prior Soyuz launch in the month of December was Soyuz TM-11 on 2 December 1990.

This mission also included the last planned docking of a Soyuz at the nadir, or Earth-facing, port of the Zarya module. The Rassvet module was attached to Zarya's nadir port during the STS-132 mission.

Relocation 
On 12 May 2010, the Soyuz TMA-17 spacecraft was relocated to the aft port of the Zvezda module. At 14:23 UTC, Kotov, Creamer and Noguchi temporarily undocked the spacecraft from the nadir port of Zarya and flew it to the aft port of the Zvezda service module. The docking occurred at 14:53 UTC. After hooks and latches were engaged, the crew conducted leak checks, opened hatches around 17:40 UTC and then re-entered the station through the service module.

Undocking and landing 

On 26 May 2010, the orbital altitude of the International Space Station (ISS) was lowered by 1.5 kilometers to 345 kilometers to ensure perfect conditions for the re-entry of the Soyuz TMA-17 into the Earth's atmosphere. The orbit of the ISS was adjusted using the four engines on board the Progress M-05M spacecraft.

Expedition 23 commander Oleg Kotov was at the controls of the Soyuz TMA-17 spacecraft as it undocked at 00:04 UTC on 2 June 2010 from the space station's Zvezda module. The Soyuz TMA-17 crew capsule landed on the steppes of Kazakhstan at 03:25 UTC on 2 June 2010 wrapping up their stay aboard the space station.

References

External links 
 Image of tower retraction.

 

Crewed Soyuz missions
Spacecraft launched in 2009
Spacecraft which reentered in 2010
Spacecraft launched by Soyuz-FG rockets